Theretairus is a Late Jurassic genus of sphenodont reptile from the Morrison Formation of western North America, present in stratigraphic zones 5 and 6.

History and naming 
The holotype consists of a right mandible and several in-socket teeth from Quarry 9 at Como Bluff, Wyoming where it was excavated by paleontologist William Harlow Reed, who then was working for Othniel Charles Marsh, and it was deposited at the Yale Peabody Museum under YPM VP 13764. The locality comes from strata of the Brushy Basin Member of the Morrison Formation, which also bears other sphenodontians Opisthias and Eilenodon. It was not named until George Gaylord Simpson described it as a new genus and species in a 1926 paper in the American Journal of Science. The generic name means "mammal companion", due to its association with the jaws of mammals in the Como Bluff quarry, and the specific name means "ancient", due to its old age as a sphenodontian.

Description and classification 
The type specimen preserves a very strange morphology, with masseteric fossae in the posterior end similar to those in mammals. The teeth progressively get larger as they get closer to the anterior end, a trait also similar to mammals. Recently, the symphysis and two (perhaps three) enlarged acrodont fangs at the anterior end of the jaw, but separated one from the other to a lesser degree of the type have linked the taxon to the Mexican taxon Sphenovipera. The anterior border of the symphysis is steeply inclined in the holotype of Theretarius, suggesting it is an adult or older individual. Theretarius preserves five fossae along the posterior end of the mandible, making the mandible lighter, a trait only shared with Sphenovipera. 

A simplified cladogram of Sphenodontia after Bever & Norell (2017) is shown below:

See also

 Prehistoric reptile
 Paleobiota of the Morrison Formation

References

Morrison fauna
Jurassic lepidosaurs
Sphenodontia
Prehistoric reptile genera